Manikpur is a census town in Sankrail CD Block of Howrah Sadar subdivision in Howrah district in the Indian state of West Bengal. It is a part of Kolkata Urban Agglomeration.

Geography

Demographics
As per 2011 Census of India Manikpur had a total population of 19,804 of which 10,392 (52%) were males and 9,412 (48%) were females. Population below 6 years was 2,253. The total number of literates in Manikpur was 13,378 (76.22% of the population over 6 years).

Manikpur was part of Kolkata Urban Agglomeration in 2011 census.

 India census, Manikpur had a population of 19,125. Males constitute 55% of the population and females 45%. Manikpur has an average literacy rate of 61%, higher than the national average of 59.5%: male literacy is 67% and female literacy is 54%. In Manikpur, 12% of the population is under 6 years of age.

Transport

Bus
 Sarenga (Kolatala More) - New Town Unitech

Train
Sankrail railway station and Abada railway station on Howrah-Kharagpur line are the nearest railway stations.

References

Cities and towns in Howrah district
Neighbourhoods in Kolkata
Kolkata Metropolitan Area